"Ordinary Lives" is a song released by the Bee Gees in 1989, taken from their 16th studio album One. The song was released as the album's first single on 27 March 1989 by Warner Records. It was written by the group and they produced it with Brian Tench. Following the premature death of their younger brother Andy Gibb in 1988, the Bee Gees dedicated this song and their new album to him. Originally the song was titled "Cruel World" but was later changed to "Ordinary Lives".

Composition and inspiration
Scott Glasel recalled that "Ordinary Lives" was started before Andy died, but as completed it seems to be a philosophical comment on life and death. For a time it was called "Cruel World", a phrase heard at the start of the second verse as complete. The rhythm has some similarity to "You Win Again" and may have been a deliberate attempt to follow it up, but it has many new features including the brief spoken word parts and the existential musings of the lyrics, something often associated with Robin but clearly here coming from Barry. Probably the finished recording has added dubs by the musicians who worked on the album One.

Barry Gibb performed this song in the 2013 Mythology Tour accompanied by his son Stephen Gibb and Maurice's daughter Samantha "Sammy" Gibb. He still used the backing vocal effect from the last part of the original record.

Music video 
The music video for the song was filmed in Los Angeles, California and received heavy airplay from 1989 to 1990. It shows the Bee Gees and their backing band consisting of Alan Kendall (guitar), with guests Nathan East (bass), and Alex Acuña (drums) in a dark studio performing the song, intersped with scenes of everyday life and an archival footage of the 1929 Wall Street Crash.

Personnel
Bee Gees
Barry Gibb – lead, harmony and backing vocals; rhythm guitar
Robin Gibb – lead, harmony and backing vocals
Maurice Gibb – harmony and backing vocals, keyboards (played bass on TV show performances of this song)
Additional musicians
Peter-John Vettese – keyboards, synthesizer
 Tim Cansfield – lead guitar
Alan Kendall – lead guitar
Nathan East – bass
Steve Ferrone – drums

Chart performance

References

Bee Gees songs
1989 singles
1989 songs
Songs written by Maurice Gibb
Songs written by Robin Gibb
Songs written by Barry Gibb
1988 songs
Warner Records singles